Vincent Musetto (May 1941 – June 9, 2015) was an American newspaper editor and film critic for the New York Post. He retired from the New York Post in 2011. He was best known for having written the headline Headless body in topless bar in 1983. The events inspiring the headline served as the premise for a 1995 American black comedy by the same title, written by Peter Koper and directed by James Bruce. After the film was released, Musetto said he didn't know what the fuss was all about; he reported "Headless" was not his best headline. Musetto died on June 9, 2015, from pancreatic cancer.

References

1941 births
2015 deaths
American film critics
American newspaper editors
People from Boonton, New Jersey
Fairleigh Dickinson University alumni
American male journalists
New York Post people
Deaths from pancreatic cancer
Deaths from cancer in New York (state)
Journalists from New Jersey
20th-century American journalists
21st-century American journalists
20th-century American male writers
21st-century American male writers